The Richmond Register is a three daily newspaper based in Richmond, Kentucky, and covering Madison County. It publishes Tuesday, Thursday and Saturday. The Register is owned by Community Newspaper Holdings Inc.

In January 2006, the Kentucky Press Association named the Register best newspaper in the state in its circulation division, based on the number of awards won in the "Daily Class 1" division (for the smallest daily newspapers by circulation) of the KPA's 2005 Excellence In Kentucky Newspapers contest.

History 
As the only surviving daily in Richmond, the Register is heir to a crowded field. The Globe Register debuted November 2, 1809, but lasted only a year before changing its name to The Luminary, which in turn was sold and became The Farmer's Chronicle in 1822. In 1845, the name changed to The Whig Chronicle; and in 1852 it became The Weekly Messenger, the largest circulated newspaper in Kentucky outside Louisville. The paper ended its run in 1862, presumably due to the onset of the American Civil War.

The story of today's Register began in 1917, when S.M. Saufley purchased two Richmond papers, The Climax and The Kentucky Register, and founded The Richmond Daily Register. The Saufley, Johnson and Challinor-Tureman families took turns as owners, publishers and general managers of the paper until 1970, when Frank Helderman Sr. bought it. His wife sold to Thomson Corporation in 1985, and Thomson yielded to American Publishing, part of Hollinger International, in 1995. The Register is now published by CNHI, which bought it in 1999.

References

External links
Richmond Register Website
CNHI Website
The Climax (1887-1897) at Chronicling America
The Richmond Climax (1897-1914) at Chronicling America
The Madisonian (1913-1914) at Chronicling America
The Climax-Madisonian (1914-1917) at Chronicling America
The Kentucky Register (1866-1917) at Chronicling America
Richmond Daily Register (1917-1922) at Chronicling America

Richmond Register
Richmond Register
Richmond, Kentucky